Estádio Hermann Aichinger, better known as Estádio da Baixada, is a multi-use stadium located in Ibirama, Santa Catarina state, in southern Brazil. It is used mostly for football matches and hosts the home games of Clube Atlético Hermann Aichinger. The stadium has a maximum capacity of 6,000 people.

References

External links
 Estádio da Baixada at Templos do Futebol

Baixada Ibirama
Sports venues in Santa Catarina (state)